Kizilsu (also as Kezilesu; ; ; Kyrgyz: , ,) is an autonomous prefecture of Kyrgyz people in the west of Xinjiang Uyghur Autonomous Region, China, bordering with Kyrgyzstan and Tajikistan.

Etymology
Kizilsu, also spelled Kizil Su, refers to the Kezi River and means “red water” in the Kyrgyz language, similar to the name of Kyzyl-Suu, Kyrgyzstan. Kizilsu is transliterated into Chinese characters as '', which is read in Mandarin Chinese as Kezilesu (pinyin-derived) and K'o-tzu-le-su / K'o-tzu-lo-su (Wade-Giles derived).

The name Kizilsu is similar to that of the nearby Zhetysu region which means "seven rivers". The name of Aksu Prefecture and of Aksu Prefecture's Onsu County (Wensu), which means "ten water" in Uyghur and other Turkic languages, all these names consist of a descriptor followed by 'su' (river; water).

Other nearby places with the word 'kizil' (red) in their names include Kiziloy, Kizil Caves and Kizilto.

History
On July 14, 1954, Kizilsu Kyrgyz Autonomous Region was established. In February 1955, the region was changed to a prefecture as Kizilsu Kyrgyz Autonomous Prefecture.

In 1955, Barin, Jamaterek and Ujme were transferred from Yengisar County to Akto County and Bulungkol was transferred to Akto County from Tashkurgan County in modern Kashgar Prefecture.

In April 1990, the Baren Township riot occurred in Barin Township, Akto County.

Subdivisions

Kizilsu directly controls 1 county-level city and 3 counties.

Demographics
According to the 2000 census, Kizilsu has 439,688 inhabitants with a population density of 6.36 inhabitants per km2. , 27% of the inhabitants of the prefecture were Kyrgyz.

Population by ethnicity

Government

Party Secretary
 
 
 Zhang Jinbiao
 
 An Zhengyu

Governor
 Perhat Turdi (2007–2016)
 Dilshat Kidirhan since 2017
 Horigul Jappar

See also
Kyrgyz in China

References

External links

 Official site (in Simplified Chinese)

Kizilsu Kyrgyz Autonomous Prefecture
Prefecture-level divisions of Xinjiang
Autonomous prefectures of the People's Republic of China
Kyrgyz in China
Turkic autonomous regions in China